James Wentworth Buller (1 October 1798 – 13 March 1865) of Downes, Crediton, Devon, was a British Whig Member of Parliament for Exeter, in Devon, from 1830 to 1835, and for North Devon  from 1857 to 1865.

Origins

He was the son of James Buller (1766–1827), MP, of Downes, the grandson of James Buller (1717-1765), MP.

Marriage and children
He married Charlotte Juliana Jane Howard-Molyneux-Howard, daughter of Lord Henry Thomas Howard-Molyneux-Howard and Elizabeth Long, on 5 October 1831. His children were:
General Rt. Hon. Sir Redvers Henry Buller (1839-1908), V.C. 
Arthur Tremayne Buller (b. 19 March 1850 - d. 28 January 1917), father of the cricketer Eric Tremayne Buller (d. 1973).

References

External links 
 

1798 births
1865 deaths
Whig (British political party) MPs for English constituencies
Liberal Party (UK) MPs for English constituencies
UK MPs 1830–1831
UK MPs 1831–1832
UK MPs 1832–1835
UK MPs 1857–1859
UK MPs 1859–1865
James Wentworth
Members of the Parliament of the United Kingdom for Exeter